Gurdjar (Kurtjar) is a Paman language of the Cape York Peninsula, Queensland, Australia. There are two dialects, Gurdjar proper (Gunggara), and Rip (Ngarap, Areba). Kunggara is another name for one or the other.

Phonology

Consonants

Vowels 

Kurtjar also has a diphthong /ua/.

References 

Paman languages
Extinct languages of Queensland